The Chairman of the Consultative Assembly of Oman is appointed by the Sultan with royal decree.

This is a list of chairmen (speakers) of the Consultative Assembly of Oman since 1991, and its predecessor, State Consultative Council which lasted from 1981 until 1991:

Sources

Politics of Oman
Oman, Consultative Assembly
1981 establishments in Oman
Oman politics-related lists